Kent Rowley (1917–1978) was a Canadian labour organizer.

Born in Montreal, Rowley became a labour activist as a young man. He opposed conscription in the early years of World War II and was held at an internment camp in Petawawa, Ontario. In 1943, he was hired by the United Textile Workers of America, for whom he was Canadian director. He was jailed for strike activities at Valleyfield, Quebec in 1946. He was dismissed by the UTWA as part of a crackdown on leftist union officers in the early 1950s. Rowley and his future wife Parent organized the Canadian Textile and Chemical Union, an independent union which operated primarily in Ontario. Unhappy with the labour establishment and its close relationship with conservative unions based in the United States, Rowley and fellow organizer Madeleine Parent founded the Confederation of Canadian Unions in 1969. Mainstream unions subsequently demanded more autonomy from their American headquarters, and several major unions broke away to form separate Canadian unions, although few joined the CCU. 

Rowley was married to Parent from 1953 until his death in 1978. A biography of Rowley was written by Rick Salutin and published in 1980.

References

1917 births
1978 deaths
Anti–World War II activists
Trade unionists from Quebec
Leaders of the United Textile Workers of America
Confederation of Canadian Unions people
Canadian trade union leaders
Activists from Montreal
Canadian prisoners and detainees